This article lists the confirmed national futsal squads for the 2004 FIFA Futsal World Championship tournament held in Chinese Taipei, between November 21 and December 5, 2004.

Group A









Group B









Group C





Head coach:  Sergio Sapo



Group D





Head coach:  Mohammad Hassan Ansarifard

S
FIFA Futsal World Cup squads